The second season of the Fairy Tail anime series was directed by Shinji Ishihira and produced by A-1 Pictures and Satelight. Like the rest of the series, it follows the adventures of Natsu Dragneel and Lucy Heartfilia of the magical guild Fairy Tail. The series contains two story arcs. The first 20 episodes make up the  arc, which adapts Hiro Mashima's Fairy Tail manga from shortly after the beginning of the 16th through the middle of the 20th volume. The arc focuses on Fairy Tail's alliance with other guilds to take down the dark guild Oración Seis, aided by the Dragon Slayer Wendy Marvell and a reformed Jellal Fernandez. The last four episodes form the self-contained  arc, where Gray Fullbuster seemingly betrays the guild and helps Daphne, a deranged wizard, capture Natsu to power an artificial dragon.

The season initially ran from October 11, 2010, to March 28, 2011, on TV Tokyo in Japan. It was later released on DVD in 12 compilations, each containing four episodes, by Pony Canyon between February 2, 2011, and January 6, 2012. It was licensed by Animax Asia for an English-subtitled Southeast Asian broadcast. Their adaptation aired from February 10, 2012, to April 23, 2012. Funimation Entertainment released the episodes with their own English-dubbed version across two Blu-ray/DVD box sets, released on July 23 and August 20 of 2013, respectively. The two sets were released as together as "Collection 3" on January 6, 2015.

The season uses of four pieces of theme music: two opening themes and two ending themes.  performed by Magic Party is used for the first 12 episodes, and "Fiesta" by +Plus for the rest of the season. The ending themes, used with the opening themes, are "Holy Shine" performed by Daisy x Daisy, and "Be as One" by W-inds.


Episode list

Notes

References

General

Specific

2
2010 Japanese television seasons
2011 Japanese television seasons